Hilda Phoebe Hudson (11 June 1881  Cambridge – 26 November 1965 London) was an English mathematician who worked on algebraic geometry, in particular on Cremona transformations. Hudson was interested in the link between mathematics and her religious beliefs.

Life and work
In 1900 Hudson gained a scholarship and entered Newnham College at the University of Cambridge, graduating in 1903, coming 7th equal among the First Class students. After a year of further study at the University of Berlin, she returned to Newnham in 1905, first as lecturer in mathematics and later as Associate Research Fellow. Trinity College Dublin awarded her an ad eundam MA, and later a DSc, in 1906 and 1913, respectively.

She was an Invited Speaker of the International Congress of Mathematicians (ICM) in 1912 at Cambridge UK. Although Laura Pisati had been invited to the 1908 ICM, she died just before the start of the conference, so Hudson became the first female invited speaker at an ICM.

She spent the academic year 1912–1913 at Bryn Mawr in the US, and the years 1913–1917 back in England, this time as lecturer at West Ham Technical Institute.   She joined an Air Ministry subdivision undertaking aeronautical engineering research in 1917, where she applied pioneering work on the application of mathematical modelling to aircraft design. She was appointed OBE in 1919. As a distinguished mathematician she was one of the few women of her time to serve on the council of the London Mathematical Society.

Most of Hudson's pure mathematical research was concerned with surfaces and plane curves, her special interest being in Cremona transformations. Her 1916 monograph Ruler and Compasses was well-received as "a welcome addition to the literature on the boundary between elementary and advanced mathematics". Her 454-page 1927 treatise Cremona transformations in plane and space is considered by John Semple to be her magnum opus.

Epidemiology
Hudson published work with Ronald Ross on epidemiology and the measurement of disease spread. "The classical susceptible-infectious-recovered (SIR) model, originated from the seminal papers of Ross and Ross and Hudson in 1916-1917 and the fundamental contributions of Kermack and McKendrick in 1927-1932, describes the transmission of infectious diseases between susceptible and infective individuals and provides the basic framework for almost all later epidemic models."

Books
 Ruler and Compasses, first published as a monograph (Longman's Modern Mathematical Series, 1916) and then included in the compendium Squaring the circle and other monographs (Chelsea n.d.)
 Cremona Transformations in Plane and Space, Cambridge University Press, 1927.

References

External links

A list of her papers can be found at Biographies of Women Mathematicians: Hilda Phoebe Hudson

1881 births
1965 deaths
English mathematicians
People from Cambridge
Women mathematicians
English women non-fiction writers
English non-fiction writers
20th-century English women writers
20th-century English non-fiction writers
British women engineers
20th-century women engineers
Steamboat ladies